Qed-her was an ancient Egyptian minor warrior and gate goddess of the underworld.

Iconography 

Qed-her was portrayed as a woman with the head of a lioness with two snakes on her head and a knife in both hands.

See also 

 Sekhmet
 Tefnut
 Nehebkau

References 

Egyptian deities